The article contains the number of cases of coronavirus disease 2019 (COVID-19) reported by each country, territory, and subnational area to the World Health Organization (WHO) and published in WHO reports, tables, and spreadsheets. For more international statistics in table and map form, see COVID-19 pandemic by country and territory.

108 countries and territories have more confirmed cases than the People's Republic of China, the country where the outbreak began. Thailand was the first country to report at least one case outside China. The United States and Italy were first two countries to overtake China in terms of the number of confirmed cases. The country that overtook China in terms of the number of confirmed cases several days later was the United Kingdom. Japan was the first country in East Asia to overtake China in terms of the number of confirmed cases. The second country in East Asia that overtook China in terms of the number of confirmed cases was South Korea, while the third one was Mongolia, the fourth one Taiwan and the fifth and most recent one North Korea. The most recent country that overtook China in terms of the number of confirmed cases was North Korea, while the most recent territory was Hong Kong. Tuvalu was the last and most recent country to report at least one case. Today, 23 most affected countries have at least five million cases, incl. the United States, India, France, Brazil, Germany, the United Kingdom, Italy, South Korea, Russia, Japan, Spain, Argentina, Australia and Poland. At the moment, 45 most affected countries, incl. Greece, Thailand, Romania, the Czech Republic, South Africa, Portugal, Canada, Chile and Hungary, have at least two million cases.

The first person infected with the disease, known as COVID-19, was discovered at the beginning of December 2019. The disease has spread very easily to the United States, India, France, Brazil, Germany, the United Kingdom, Italy, South Korea, Russia, Japan, Spain, Argentina, Australia, Poland, Portugal, Thailand, Greece, Chile, Canada, South Africa, the Czech Republic, Romania, Hungary and Egypt and many other countries. The COVID-19 outbreak has been a pandemic since 11 March 2020. A total of about 6.6 million deaths worldwide pertaining to COVID-19 was reported as of January 2023. At the beginning of December 2022, the third anniversary of the beginning of the COVID-19 outbreak was commemorated. Egypt and Hungary. On 11 March 2022, the second anniversary of the day when the COVID-19 outbreak became a pandemic was commemorated.

On 11 February 2022, Japan, formerly the most affected country in East Asia, joined the list of 20 most affected countries, incl. the United States, India, France, Brazil, Germany, the United Kingdom, Russia, Italy, Spain, Argentina, Australia and Poland. More than a week later, on 20 February 2022, South Korea, formerly the second most affected country in East Asia, joined the list of 40 most affected countries, incl. Thailand, Greece, Chile, Canada, South Africa, the Czech Republic, and Romania. At the beginning of March 2022, South Korea joined the list of 30 most affected countries on the first anniversary of the day when it overtook China in terms of the number of cases. On 4 March 2022, South Korea joined the list of 20 most affected countries, incl. eight in Europe, such as France, Germany and the United Kingdom. On 26 March 2022, South Korea joined the list of ten most affected countries, like the United Kingdom.

The first section contains summary information: the total number of countries and territories with at least 100, 1,000, 10,000, 100,000, a million and ten million cases; the number of cases reported to WHO; the countries and territories that have reported no cases yet to WHO; and two charts showing the 20 countries and territories with the highest numbers of cases and deaths per capita. In the second section, the table has a timeline of confirmed cases of COVID-19. The number of countries affected is shown, along with the number of days taken for the number of cases to double. The table can be sorted by country or date of first confirmed case.

As of January 2023, North Korea has put its capital, Pyongyang, on a 5-day lockdown due to a reported "respiratory illness", though it did not mention COVID-19. Residents told to stay home and submit to temperature checks multiple times daily.

Current situation

Current situation (cases)
Worldwide
As of : 
 108 countries and territories with more cases than mainland China. North Korea was the most recent country to overtake China in terms of the number of cases while Hong Kong was the most recent territory.
 223 countries and territories with at least 100 cases. In some of those countries, it took 20 days to reach 100.
 220 countries and territories with at least 1,000 cases. From 100 to 1,000, it took nine days in some of those countries.
 198 countries and territories with at least 10,000 cases. From 1,000 to 10,000, it took ten days in some of those countries.
 129 countries and territories with at least 100,000 cases. From 10,000 to 100,000, it took an average of 15 days in some of those countries.
 68 countries and territories with at least a million cases. From 100,000 to a million, it took an average of 39 days in some of those countries.
 13 countries with at least ten million cases, such as the United States, the United Kingdom, South Korea and Japan. From a million to ten million, it took an average of less than six months in three of those countries.

Territory without confirmed cases 
Turkmenistan has not reported any cases to the WHO, but is strongly suspected of having had infections with the disease.

Monthly links
The pages below provide tables of daily figures:
 COVID-19 pandemic cases in January 2020
 COVID-19 pandemic cases in February 2020
 COVID-19 pandemic cases in March 2020
 COVID-19 pandemic cases in April 2020
 COVID-19 pandemic cases in May 2020
 COVID-19 pandemic cases in June 2020
 COVID-19 pandemic cases in July 2020
 COVID-19 pandemic cases in August 2020
 COVID-19 pandemic cases in September 2020
 COVID-19 pandemic cases in October 2020
 COVID-19 pandemic cases in November 2020
 COVID-19 pandemic cases in December 2020
 COVID-19 pandemic cases in January 2021
 COVID-19 pandemic cases in February 2021
 COVID-19 pandemic cases in March 2021
 COVID-19 pandemic cases in April 2021
 COVID-19 pandemic cases in May 2021
 COVID-19 pandemic cases in June 2021
 COVID-19 pandemic cases in July 2021
 COVID-19 pandemic cases in August 2021

Cumulative monthly case totals by country

2020

2021

2022

Reliability of the confirmed counts
Doctors and media expressed scepticism of official infection counts in some countries, and statistical analysis suggested anomalies. Sceptics of the Russian official counts included medical doctor Anastasia Vasilyeva, doctors Ivan Konovalov and Samuel Greene, and medical news editor Aleksey Torgashev. The Nexta media agency stated that it had obtained leaked administrative documents showing higher infection counts than those publicly stated by Belarusian authorities. Statistical analysis of official counts from around the world found signs of "suspiciously low statistical noise" in the officially confirmed counts of some countries, with the Algerian counts including a 28-day sequence with a strongly sub-Poissonian noise level, and 28-day sequences best modelled as having sub-Poissonian noise for the daily confirmed counts in Tajikistan, Turkey, Russia, Belarus, Albania, the United Arab Emirates and Nicaragua.

Lower statistical noise in the official infection counts is statistically associated with less press freedom, as measured by the Reporters Without Borders Press Freedom Index. Benford's law analysis of the rising phase of the pandemic per country found that the official counts are more statistically credible for countries that are more democratic, have higher GDP per capita, or have more health funding or better universal health insurance systems.

See also 

 COVID-19 pandemic
 COVID-19 pandemic death rates by country
 COVID-19 pandemic by country and territory

References

External links 
 COVID-19 Risk Factors

Cases